The 18th CARIFTA Games was held in Bridgetown, Barbados on March 25–27, 1989.

Participation (unofficial)

For the 1989 CARIFTA Games only the medalists can be found on the "World Junior Athletics History" website.  An unofficial count yields the number of about 105 medalists (59 junior (under-20) and 46 youth (under-17)) from about 17 countries:  Antigua and Barbuda (1), Bahamas (20), Barbados (6), Bermuda (2), British Virgin Islands (1), Cayman Islands (3), Dominica (2), Grenada (5), Guadeloupe (2), Guyana (5), Jamaica (35), Martinique (7), Netherlands Antilles (2), Saint Kitts and Nevis (2), Saint Lucia (2), Saint Vincent and the Grenadines (2), Trinidad and Tobago (8).

Austin Sealy Award

The Austin Sealy Trophy for the most outstanding athlete of the games was awarded to Kareem Streete-Thompson from the Cayman Islands.  He won a gold medal in long jump with a remarkable jump of 7.83m, which is still the championships record, a silver medal in 100m, and a bronze medal in 200 metres in the youth (U-17) category.

Medal summary
Medal winners are published by category: Boys under 20 (Junior), Girls under 20 (Junior), Boys under 17 (Youth), and Girls under 17 (Youth).
The medalists can also be found on the "World Junior Athletics History"
website.

Boys under 20 (Junior)

Girls under 20 (Junior)

Boys under 17 (Youth)

Girls under 17 (Youth)

Medal table (unofficial)

References

External links
World Junior Athletics History

CARIFTA Games
International athletics competitions hosted by Barbados
CARIFTA Games
CARIFTA Games
CARIFTA Games